Karina Sefron   (born 2 July 1967) is a Danish footballer who played as a defender for the Denmark women's national football team. She was part of the team at the 1991 FIFA Women's World Cup as the team captain. On club level she plays for Malmö FF in Sweden.

References

External links
 

1967 births
Living people
Danish women's footballers
Denmark women's international footballers
Danish expatriate sportspeople in Germany
Place of birth missing (living people)
1991 FIFA Women's World Cup players
Women's association football defenders
Expatriate women's footballers in Sweden
Expatriate women's footballers in Germany
Damallsvenskan players